Bulimulus  is a genus of small to medium-sized tropical or sub-tropical, air-breathing land snails, pulmonate gastropod mollusks in the subfamily Bulimulinae within the family Bulimulidae.

Bulimulus is the type genus of the subfamily Bulimulinae. The shells are high and conical, and are medium-sized, ranging from about 20 mm (0.8 inches) to about 50 mm (2 inches) long.

Species
Species in the genus Bulimulus include:

 Bulimulus acholus Mabille, 1895;
 Bulimulus albus (G. B. Sowerby, 1839)
 Bulimulus angustus Weyrauch, 1966
 Bulimulus apodemetes (Orbigny, 1835)
 Bulimulus aurismalchi (O. F. Müller, 1774)
 Bulimulus bonariensis (Orbigny, 1835)
 Bulimulus bouvieri Dautzenberg, 1897
 Bulimulus brunoi (Ihering, 1917)
 Bulimulus buenavistensis Pilsbry, 1897
 Bulimulus cacotycus Mabille, 1895
 Bulimulus cacticolus (Reeve, 1849)
 Bulimulus carmen Pilsbry & H.N. Lowe, 1932
 Bulimulus castelneaui (L. Pfeiffer, 1857)
 Bulimulus catlowae (Pfeiffer, 1847)
 Bulimulus coriaceus (L. Pfeiffer, 1856)
 Bulimulus corderoi (Parodiz, 1962)
 Bulimulus corneus (G. B. Sowerby I, 1833)
 Bulimulus corumbaensis (Pilsbry, 1857)
 Bulimulus cuernavacensis Crosse & P. Fischer, 1874 (uncertain species)
 Bulimulus dealbatus var. jonesi Clench, 1937
 Bulimulus dealbatus neomexicanus Pilsbry, 1946
 Bulimulus dealbatus ozarkensis Pilsbry & Ferris, 1906
 Bulimulus dealbatus ragsdalei (Pilsbry, 1890)
 Bulimulus diaphanus
 Bulimulus diaphanus fraterculus (Potiez & Michaud, 1835)
 Bulimulus dismenicus Mabille, 1895;
 Bulimulus dukenfieldi Melvill, 1900
 Bulimulus dysoni (L. Pfeiffer, 1846)
 Bulimulus eganus (L. Pfeiffer, 1853)
 Bulimulus elatior Hylton Scott, 1952
 Bulimulus erectus (Reeve, 1849)
Bulimulus fazendicus Maury, 1935 - Paleocene fossil
 Bulimulus felipponei Marshall, 1930
 Bulimulus fourmiersi (d'Orbigny, 1835)
 Bulimulus fraterculus (A. Férussac, 1821)
 Bulimulus fuscus Guilding, 1828
 Bulimulus gittenbergeri Breure, 1974
 Bulimulus glandiniformis G. B. Sowerby III, 1892
 Bulimulus gorritiensis Pilsbry, 1897
 Bulimulus gracilis Hylton Scott, 1948
 Bulimulus guadalupensis (Bruguière, 1789)
Bulimulus guadalupensis shadowei (Herrera, 2020)
 Bulimulus hamiltoni (Reeve, 1849)
 Bulimulus haplochrous (L. Pfeiffer, 1855)
 Bulimulus hummelincki (Breure, 1974)
 Bulimulus inermis (Morelet, 1851)
 Bulimulus inutilis (Reeve, 1850)
 Bulimulus irregularis (Pfeiffer, 1847)
 Bulimulus juvenilis (L. Pfeiffer, 1855)
 † Bulimulus klappenbachi (Parodiz, 1969)
 Bulimulus krebsianus Pilsbry, 1897
 Bulimulus lehmanni (L. Pfeiffer, 1865)
 Bulimulus lherminieri (P. Fischer, 1857)
 Bulimulus limnoides (Férussac, 1832)
 Bulimulus marcidus (L. Pfeiffer, 1853)
 Bulimulus mollicellus (Reeve, 1849)
 Bulimulus mooreanus L. Pfeiffer, 1868
 Bulimulus nigromontanus Dall, 1897
 Bulimulus ouallensis Breure & Hovestadt, 2016
 Bulimulus ovulum (Reeve, 1844)
 Bulimulus pasonis Pilsbry, 1902
 Bulimulus pervius (L. Pfeiffer, 1853)
 Bulimulus pliculatus (L. Pfeiffer, 1857)
 Bulimulus pliculosus (Ancey, 1901) (taxon inquirendum)
 Bulimulus prosopidis Holmberg, 1912
 Bulimulus pubescens (Moricand, 1836)
 Bulimulus quitensis (Pfeiffer, 1847)
 Bulimulus prosopidis Holmberg, 1912
 Bulimulus recognitus Mabille, 1895
 Bulimulus regina (T.E. Bowdich ex A.E.J. Férussac, 1822) 
 Bulimulus rushii (Pilsbry, 1896)
 Bulimulus sanmarcosensis Pilsbry & H.N. Lowe, 1932
 Bulimulus sarcodes (L. Pfeiffer, 1846)
 Bulimulus schadei Schlesch, 1935
 Bulimulus schiedeanus (Pfeiffer, 1841)
 Bulimulus schiedeanus pecosensis Pilsbry & Ferris 1906
 Bulimulus sepulchralis Poey, 1852
 Bulimulus slevini Hanna, 1923
 Bulimulus subspirifer Mabille, 1895
 Bulimulus sula Simone & Amaral, 2018
 Bulimulus tenuissimus (Orbigny, 1835)
 Bulimulus transparens (Reeve, 1849)
Bulimulus trindadeae Ferreira & Coelho, 1971 - Paleocene fossil
 Bulimulus turritellatus Beck, 1837
 Bulimulus turritus (Broderip, 1832)
 Bulimulus unicolor (G. B. Sowerby I, 1833)
 Bulimulus uniplicatus (Férussac, 1827)
 Bulimulus versicolor (Jan, 1832)
 Bulimulus vesicalis (L. Pfeiffer, 1853)
 Bulimulus vesicalis uruguayanus (Pilsbry, 1897)
 Bulimulus wiebesi Breure, 1974

Synonyms
 Bulimulus dealbatus (Say, 1821): synonym of Rabdotus dealbatus (Say, 1821)
 Bulimulus inconspicuus Haas, 1949: synonym of Drymaeus inconspicuus (Haas, 1949) (original combination)
 Bulimulus pilsbryi Ferris 1925: synonym of Rabdotus pilsbryi (Ferriss, 1925)
 Bulimulus sporadicus (Orbigny, 1835): synonym of Bulimulus bonariensis (Rafinesque, 1833)
 Bulimulus trindadensis Breure & Coelho, 1976 is a synonym for Vegrandinia trindadensis (Breure & Coelho, 1976) within Subulinidae.

References

External links

tree snails of Florida, Bulimulus spp. on the UF / IFAS Featured Creatures Web site
 

 
Bulimulidae